Fabien Jarsalé (born August 20, 1990 in Vannes) is a French professional football player. Currently, he plays in the Championnat National 3 for Vertou.

External links
 

1990 births
Living people
French footballers
Ligue 2 players
Vannes OC players
SR Colmar players
Championnat National players
Association football midfielders